In finance, the private-equity secondary market (also often called private-equity secondaries or secondaries) refers to the buying and selling of pre-existing investor commitments to private-equity and other alternative investment funds. Given the absence of established trading markets for these interests, the transfer of interests in private-equity funds as well as hedge funds can be more complex and labor-intensive.

Sellers of private-equity investments sell not only the investments in the fund but also their remaining unfunded commitments to the funds. By its nature, the private-equity asset class is illiquid, intended to be a long-term investment for buy-and-hold investors, including "pension funds, endowments and wealthy families selling off their private equity funds before the pools have sold off all their assets". For the vast majority of private-equity investments, there is no listed public market; however, there is a robust and maturing secondary market available for sellers of private-equity assets.

Buyers seek to acquire private-equity interests in the secondary market for multiple reasons. For example, the duration of the investment may be much shorter than an investment in the private-equity fund initially. Likewise, the buyer may be able to acquire these interests at an attractive price. Finally, the buyer can evaluate the fund's holdings before deciding to purchase an interest in the fund. Conversely, sellers may seek to sell interest for various reasons, including the need to raise capital, the desire to avoid future capital calls, the need to reduce an over-allocation to the asset class or for regulatory reasons.

Driven by strong demand for private-equity exposure over the past decade, a vast amount of capital has been committed to secondary-market funds from investors looking to increase and diversify their private-equity exposure.

Secondary-market participants
The private-equity secondary market was originally created by Dayton Carr, the founder of Venture Capital Fund of America (VCFA Group), in 1982. Carr had been managing a venture capital investment firm in partnership with Thomas J. Watson, Jr. who was then Chairman of IBM Corporation. As their venture fund matured Carr purchased Watson out of his partnership interest in 1979, just before Watson became U.S. Ambassador to the Soviet Union (Appointed by Jimmy Carter). This is believed to be one of the earliest  private-equity secondary transactions. Carr, shortly there after, made a strong return on this investment and subsequently shifted his investment focus to purchasing other limited partnership interests in venture capital funds. Through a series of small funds, raised and managed by Dayton Carr, under the VCFA name, the secondary industry was born. VCFA is still in business today and still focuses primarily on secondary private equity investments in venture and growth equity funds. Since its inception through VCFA Group the secondary industry now features dozens of dedicated firms and institutional investors that engage in the purchase and sale of private-equity interests. Recent estimates by advisory firm Evercore gauged the overall secondary market's size for 2013 to be around $26 billion, with approximately $45 billion of "dry powder" (not yet invested capital) available at the end of 2013 and a further $30 billion expected to be raised in 2014. Such large volumes have been fueled by an increasing number of players over the years, which ultimately led to what today has become a highly competitive and fragmented market. Leading secondary investment firms with current dedicated secondary capital in excess of circa $3 billion include: AlpInvest Partners, Ardian (formerly AXA Private Equity), Capital Dynamics, Coller Capital, HarbourVest Partners, Lexington Partners, Pantheon Ventures, Partners Group and Neuberger Berman.

Additionally, major investment banking firms including Credit Suisse, Deutsche Bank, Goldman Sachs, JPMorgan Chase, Morgan Stanley have active secondary investment programs. Other institutional investors typically have appetites for secondary interests. More and more primary investors, whether private-equity funds of funds or other institutional investors, also allocate some of their primary program to secondaries.

As the private-equity secondary market matures, non-traditional secondary strategies are emerging. One such strategy is preferred capital, where both limited partners and general partners can raise additional capital at net asset value whilst preserving ownership of their portfolio and its future upside.

Types of secondary transactions

Secondary transactions can be generally split into two basic categories:

Sale of fund interests
A common secondary transaction, this category includes the sale of an investor's interest in a private equity fund or portfolio of interests in various funds through the transfer of the investor's limited partnership or LLC member ownership interest in the fund(s).  Nearly all types of private-equity funds (including buyout, growth equity, venture capital, mezzanine, distressed, and real estate) can be sold in the secondary market. The transfer of the fund interest typically will allow the investor to receive some liquidity for the funded investments as well as a release from any remaining unfunded obligations to the fund. In addition to traditional cash sales, sales of fund interests are consummated through a number of structured transactions:

Structured joint ventures
Includes a wide variety of negotiated transactions between the buyer and seller that typically are customized to the specific needs of the buyer and seller.  Typically, the buyer and seller agree on an economic arrangement that is more complex than a simple transfer of 100% ownership of the fund interest.

Securitization
An investor contributes its fund interests into a new vehicle (a collateralized-fund-obligation vehicle) which in turn issues notes and generates partial liquidity for the seller.  Typically, the investor will also sell a portion of the equity in the leveraged vehicle. This is also referred to as a collateralized-fund-obligation vehicle.

Stapled transactions
Commonly referred to as stapled secondaries. Occurs when a private-equity firm (the GP) is raising a new fund. A secondary buyer purchases an interest in an existing fund from a current investor and makes a new commitment to the new fund being raised by the GP. These transactions are often initiated by private-equity firms during the fundraising process. They had become less and less frequent during 2008 and 2009 as the appetite for primary investments shrunk. Since 2009, a limited number of spinout transactions have been completed involving captive teams within financial institutions.

Low-funded secondary
A secondary transaction where an LP gains liquidity very early in the life of the fund, where the fund has called under 10% of the fund or less

Sale of direct interests

Secondary directs or synthetic secondaries
This category is the sale of portfolios of direct investments in operating companies, rather than limited-partnership interests in investment funds. These portfolios historically have originated from either corporate development programs or large financial institutions. Typically, this category can be subdivided as follows:

Secondary direct
The sale of a captive portfolio of direct investments to a secondary buyer that will either manage the investments themselves or arrange for a new manager for the investments. One of the most notable examples of a corporate seller engaging into a direct portfolios sale is the two consecutive sales of direct portfolios from AEA Technology to Coller Capital and Vision Capital in 2005 and 2006 respectively.

Synthetic secondary or spinout
Under a synthetic secondary transaction, secondary investors acquire an interest in a new limited partnership that is formed specifically to hold a portfolio of direct investments. Typically, the manager of the new fund had historically managed the assets as a captive portfolio. The most notable example of this type of transaction is the spinout of MidOcean Partners from Deutsche Bank in 2003.

Tail-end
This category typically refers to the sale of the remaining assets in a private-equity fund that is approaching, or has exceeded, its anticipated life. A tail-end transaction allows the manager of the fund to achieve liquidity for the fund's investors.

Structured secondary
This category typically refers to the structured sale of a portfolio of private-equity fund interests whereby the seller keeps some or all of the fund interests on its balance sheet but the buyer agrees to fund all future capital calls of the seller's portfolio in exchange for a preferred return secured against future distributions of the seller's portfolio. These type of secondary transactions have become increasingly explored since mid-2008 and throughout 2009 as many sellers did not want to take a loss through a straight sale of their portfolio at a steep discount but instead were ready to abandon some of the future upside in exchange for a bridge of the uncalled capital commitments.

History

Early history
The Venture Capital Fund of America (today VCFA Group), founded in 1982 by Dayton Carr, was likely the first investment firm to begin purchasing private-equity interests in existing venture-capital, leveraged-buyout and mezzanine funds, as well as direct secondary interests in private companies. Other early pioneers in the secondary market include: Jeremy Coller, the founder of Coller Capital and the individual credited with industrialising secondaries; Arnaud Isnard, who worked with Carr at VCFA and would later form ARCIS, a secondary firm based in France and Stanley Alfeld, founder of Landmark Partners.

In the years immediately following the dot-com crash, many investors sought an early exit from their outstanding commitments to the private equity asset class, particularly venture capital. As a result, the nascent secondary market became an increasingly active sector within private equity in these years.  Secondary transaction volume increased from historical levels of 2% or 3% of private-equity commitments to 5% of the addressable market. Many of the largest financial institutions (e.g., Deutsche Bank, Abbey National, UBS AG) sold portfolios of direct investments and "pay-to-play" funds portfolios that were typically used as a means to gain entry to lucrative leveraged finance and mergers and acquisitions assignments but had created hundreds of millions of dollars of losses.

2004 to 2007
The surge in activity in the secondary market, between 2004 and 2007, prompted new entrants to the market. It was during this time that the market evolved from what had previously been a relatively small niche into a functioning and important area of the private-equity industry. Prior to 2004, the market was still characterized by limited liquidity and distressed prices with private-equity funds trading at significant discounts to fair value. Beginning in 2004 and extending through 2007, the secondary market transformed into a more efficient market in which assets for the first time traded at or above their estimated fair values and liquidity increased dramatically.  During these years, the secondary market transitioned from a niche sub-category in which the majority of sellers were distressed to an active market with ample supply of assets and numerous market participants. By 2006, active portfolio management had become far more common in the increasingly developed secondary market, and an increasing number of investors had begun to pursue secondary sales to rebalance their private-equity portfolios.  The continued evolution of the private-equity secondary market reflected the maturation and evolution of the larger private-equity industry.

2008 and the credit crisis
The secondary market for private-equity interests has entered a new phase in 2008 with the onset and acceleration of the financial crisis of 2007–2008. Pricing in the market fell steadily throughout 2008 as the supply of interests began to greatly outstrip demand and the outlook for leveraged buyout and other private-equity investments worsened. Financial institutions, including Citigroup and ABN AMRO as well as affiliates of AIG and Macquarie, were prominent sellers.

With the crash in global markets from in the fall of 2008, more sellers entered the market including publicly traded private-equity vehicles, endowments, foundations and pension funds. Many sellers were facing significant overcommitments to their private-equity programs and in certain cases significant unfunded commitments to new private-equity funds were prompting liquidity concerns. With the dramatic increase in the number of distressed sellers entering the market at the same time, the pricing level in the secondary market dropped rapidly. In these transactions, sellers were willing to accept major discounts to current valuations (typically in reference to the previous quarterly net asset value published by the underlying private-equity fund manager) as they faced the prospect of further asset write-downs in their existing portfolios or as they had to achieve liquidity under a limited amount of time.

At the same time, the outlook for buyers became more uncertain and a number of prominent secondary players were slow to purchase assets. In certain cases, buyers that had agreed to secondary purchases began to exercise material-adverse-change (MAC) clauses in their contracts to walk away from deals that they had agreed to only weeks before.

Private-equity fund managers published their December 2008 valuations with substantial write-downs to reflect the falling value of the underlying companies. As a result, the discount to net asset value offered by buyers to sellers of such assets was reduced.  However, activity in the secondary market fell dramatically from 2008 levels as market participants continued to struggle to agree on price. Reflecting the gains in the public-equity markets since the end of the first quarter, the dynamics in the secondary market continued to evolve. Certain buyers that had been reluctant to invest earlier in the year began to return and non-traditional investors were more active, particularly for unfunded commitments, than they had been in previous years.

2010 to 2011 – post-financial-crisis
Since mid-2010, the secondary market has seen increased levels of activity resulting from improved pricing conditions. Through the middle of 2011, the level of activity has continued to remain at elevated levels as sellers have entered the market with large portfolios, the most attractive funds being transacted at around NAV. As the European sovereign debt crisis hit the financial markets during summer 2011, the private-equity secondary market subsequently saw a decrease both in supply and demand for portfolios of interests in private-equity fund, leading to reduced pricing levels compared to pre-summer-2011. However, the volumes on the secondary market were not expected to decrease in 2012 compared to 2011, a record year as, in addition to the banks under pressure from the Basel III regulations, other institutional investors, including pension funds, insurance companies and sovereign wealth funds continued to utilize the secondary market to divest assets.

In terms of fundraising, secondary investment firms have been the beneficiaries of the gradually improving private-equity fundraising market conditions. From 2010 through 2013, each of the large secondary fund managers have raised successor funds, sometimes exceeding their fundraising targets.

2012 
2012 saw a record level of activity on the secondary market peaking at around $26bn of transactions completed. Lloyds Banking Group plc sold a $1.9bn portfolio of private-equity funds to Coller Capital. New York City Employees Retirement System sold a $975 million portfolio of private-equity fund interests. State of Wisconsin Investment Board sold a $1 billion portfolio of large buyout fund interests Swedish Länsförsäkringar sold a €1.5bn PE portfolio.

2013 
In February, NorthStar Realty Finance spent $390 million buying a 51 percent stake in a portfolio of 45 real estate fund interests previously owned by financial services organization TIAA-CREF. Growth in the secondary market continued trending upward in 2013 reaching its highest level yet, with an estimated total transaction volume of $36bn per the Setter Capital Volume Report 2013, as follows: private equity $28 billion, real estate secondaries $5.1 billion, hedge fund side pockets $1.6 billion, infrastructure funding $0.7 billion and timber fund deals at $0.2 billion. Average discount to net asset value decreased from 35% in 2009 to 7% in 2013.

2014 
Growth in the secondary market continued trending upward in 2014 reaching its highest level yet, with an estimated total transaction volume of $49.3bn per the Setter Capital Volume Report 2014, as follows: private equity $37.9 billion, real estate secondaries $6.8 billion, hedge fund side pockets $2.5 billion, infrastructure funding $1.9 billion and timber fund deals at $0.2 billion. According to Setter Capital Inc, there were a total of 1270 transactions in 2014, with an average size of approximately $37.7 million. Although the number of transactions was roughly the same as in 2013, the average deal size increased 34.6% year over year, reflecting the fact that more multi-hundred million / billion+ dollar transactions were completed in 2014. Indeed, the breadth and number of buyers continues to increase with total volume and activity of small and medium buyers becoming more significant. Large buyers accounted for 59.8% of the market's total volume in 2014, while mid-sized buyers accounted for roughly 34.9% of total volume and small buyers represented roughly 5.3%. Also driving the expansion of the secondary market is the number of buyers expanding their scope of interest into areas in which they were previously inactive. Approximately 31.4% of buyers broadened their secondary focus in 2014 to include buying other alternative investment types (e.g. infrastructure, real estate, portfolios of direct, etc.) – an increase of 1.4% from 2013.

2014–2018 
During the four-year period between 2014 and 2018, the secondaries market continued its upward trajectory, approaching $40 billion in transaction volume in the second half of 2017. The figure represents approximately five times total deal activity from 2005 levels. Market watchers attributed the rise to the growing sophistication of secondaries transactions, increased demand for liquidity on the part of institutional investors and a growing number of fund managers using the secondary market to gain access to new streams of capital.

The period also gave rise to GP-led restructurings, in which a fund manager leads efforts to restructure the economics of the fund or roll existing fund commitments into a new vehicle. According to Credit Suisse, GP-led secondaries have grown from 10 percent of the market in 2012 to over a third by the end of 2017. Market insiders predict GP-led secondaries to eventually reach 50 percent of market share by the end of 2018, attributing a growing acceptance of their use among marquee private-equity firms such as Warburg Pincus and BC Partners as cause for their mainstream acceptance.

Milestones
The following is a timeline of some of the most notable secondary transactions and other milestones:

2011
 Coller Capital acquires Crédit Agricole Private Equity (CAPE) and the large majority of the funds CAPE manages.
 AXA Private Equity completes a series of large portfolio purchases including $1.7 billion of private-equity fund assets from Citigroup and $740 million of fund assets from Barclays.
 Auldbrass Partners founded as a spinout from Citigroup
 CalPERS sells an $800 million portfolio of private-equity funds to AlpInvest Partners.

2010
 Lloyds Banking Group plc sells a portfolio comprising 33 fund interests, primarily European mid-market funds, for a value of $730m to Lexington Partners. In a separate transaction Lloyds sells a £480 million portfolio to Coller Capital through a joint venture.
 Citigroup sells a $1 billion portfolio of funds interests and co-investments to Lexington Partners. As part of the deal, StepStone Group will take over management of a portfolio of funds-of-funds and buyout co-investments previously run by Citi Private Equity .
 Bank of America sells a portfolio comprising 60 fund interests for a value of $1.9 billion to AXA Private Equity.

2009
 3i sells its European venture capital portfolio comprising interests in 30 companies for $220m to DFJ Esprit, a venture capital fund backed by two global private-equity investors: HarbourVest Partners and Coller Capital.
 APEN (fka AIG Private Equity) refinances its private-equity fund portfolio through a $225m structured secondary transaction led by Fortress Investment Group.

2008
 ABN AMRO sells a portfolio of private-equity interests in 32 European companies managed by AAC Capital Partners to a consortium comprising Goldman Sachs, AlpInvest Partners, and CPP for $1.5 billion.
 Macquarie Capital Alliance, in June 2008, announced a takeover offer from a consortium of private-equity secondary firms including AlpInvest Partners, HarbourVest Partners, Pantheon Ventures, Partners Group, Paul Capital, Portfolio Advisors, and Procific (a subsidiary of the Abu Dhabi Investment Authority) in one of the first public to private transactions of a publicly traded private-equity company completed by secondary market investors.
 17Capital founded - a pioneer of preferred capital, a non-traditional secondary strategy.

2007
 California Public Employees' Retirement System (CalPERS) agrees to the sale of $2.1 billion portfolio of legacy private-equity funds at the end of 2007, after a process that had lasted more than a year. The buying group included Oak Hill Investment Management, Conversus Capital, Lexington Partners, HarbourVest, Coller Capital, and Pantheon Ventures.
 Coller Capital completes $4.8 billion fundraising and Lexington Partners completes $3.8 billion fundraising for their newest funds, the largest and second largest funds raised to date in the secondary market
 Ohio Bureau of Workers' Compensation sells a $400 million portfolio of private-equity fund interests to Pomona Capital
 MetLife sells a $400 million portfolio of private-equity fund interests to CSFB Strategic Partners
 Bank of America completes the spin-out of BA Venture Partners to form Scale Venture Partners, which was funded by an undisclosed consortium of secondary investors

2006
 Goldman Sachs Vintage Funds purchases a $1.4 billion private-equity portfolio (fund and direct interests) from Mellon Financial Corporation, following the announcement of Mellon's merger with Bank of New York
 American Capital Strategies sells a $1 billion portfolio of investments to a consortium of secondary buyers including HarbourVest Partners, Lexington Partners and Partners Group
 Bank of America completes the spin-out of BA Capital Europe to form Argan Capital, which was funded by an undisclosed consortium of secondary investors
 JPMorgan Chase completes the sale of a $900 million interest in JPMP Global Fund to a consortium of secondary investors
 Temasek Holdings completes $810 million securitization of a portfolio of 46 private-equity funds
 The Equitable Life Assurance Society completes the £435 million sale of a portfolio of 10 real estate secondaries to Liquid Realty Partners

2005
 Dresdner Bank sells a $1.4 billion private-equity funds portfolio to AIG 
 Lexington Partners and AlpInvest Partners acquired a portfolio of private-equity fund interests from Dayton Power & Light, an Ohio-based electric utility
Merrill Lynch completes the sale of a 20 fund portfolio of private-equity funds to Lexington Partners

2004
 Bank One sells a $1 billion portfolio of private-equity fund interests to Landmark Partners 
 The State of Connecticut Retirement and Trust completes the sale of a portfolio of private-equity fund interests to Coller Capital, representing one of the first secondary market sales by a US pension fund
 Abbey National plc completes the sale of £748m ($1.33 billion) of LP interests in 41 private-equity funds and 16 interests in private European companies, to Coller Capital
 Swiss Life sold more than 40 fund and direct investments to Pantheon Ventures
 Vintage Investment Partners announces first venture Secondary fund, the largest ever based in Israel and the Middle East.

2003
 HarbourVest acquires a $1.3 billion of private-equity fund interests in over 50 funds from UBS AG through a joint-venture transaction 
 Deutsche Bank sells a $2 billion investment portfolio to a consortium of secondary investors, led by NIB Capital (today AlpInvest), that would become MidOcean Partners

2002
 W Capital, first fund developed to purchase direct company positions on a secondary basis, formed

2001
 Coller Capital acquires 27 companies owned by Lucent Technologies, kick-starting the evolution of the market for "secondary direct" or "synthetic secondary" interests.

2000
 Lexington Partners and Hamilton Lane acquire $500 million portfolio of private-equity fund interests from Chase Capital Partners
 Coller Capital and Lexington Partners complete the purchase of over 250 direct equity investments valued at nearly $1 billion from National Westminster Bank

1999
 The Crossroads Group, which was subsequently acquired by Lehman Brothers, acquired a $340 million portfolio of direct investments in large- and mid-cap companies from Electronic Data Systems (EDS)

1998
 Coller Capital launches the first globally focused secondaries fund

1997
 Secondary volume estimated to exceed $1 billion for first time

1994
 Lexington Partners founded by former Landmark Partners professionals Brent Nicklas and Richard Lichter (currently Newbury Partners)
 Coller Capital launches Europe's first secondary fund

1992
 Landmark Partners acquires $157 million of LBO fund interests from Westinghouse Credit Corporation
 VCFA Group completes the purchase of the Northrop Grumman Ventures portfolio of assets

1991
 Paul Capital founded and acquires $85 million venture portfolio from Hillman Ventures

1989
 Coller Capital founded by Jeremy Coller
 Landmark Partners founded by Stanley Alfeld, John A. Griner III and Brent Nicklas

1988
 Pantheon Ventures launched Pantheon International Participation, an early dedicated secondary fund

1982
 Venture Capital Fund of America (VCFA Group) founded by Dayton Carr

See also
 Private equity
 List of private-equity firms
 Venture capital
 History of private equity and venture capital

References

 Lemke, Thomas P., Lins, Gerald T., Hoenig, Kathryn L. & Rube, Patricia S., Hedge Funds and Other Private Equity Funds: Regulation and Compliance (Thomson West, 2014 ed.).
 Cannon, Vincent T. Secondary Markets in Private Equity and the Future of U.S. Capital Markets, Harvard Law School.
 All about private equity investing in Secondaries (AltAssets), Sector Analysis: Case for Sectors. (Articles from 2001-2007)
 Private Equity Secondaries Ennis Knupp
 The evolution of private equity secondary activity in the United States: liquidity for an illiquid asset (Routes to Liquidity, 2004)
 Overlooking Private Equity Partnerships Can Be Costly Mistake Secondary Market Offers Liquidity for Limited Partners (Turnaround Management Association, 2006)

Notes

 
 
Financial economics